Northdoor is a London-based IT consultancy company, which was originally established in 1987, under the name Probedial Ltd.  It provides a broad range of IT services to financial and insurance companies in the City of London and elsewhere.

The company's partners include Microsoft, and IBM.

History
In 2005, Northdoor was appointed by Oracle Hyperion to resell their portfolio of business performance management software in the UK and Ireland.

In 2012, Northdoor became the first UK company to designated by IBM as a Power Systems Specialty Partner.

Products and services

Northdoor NDEX
Northdoor NDEX is an insurance administration solution which is used by customers such as StarStone Insurance Company (previously Torus Insurance Holdings Ltd), and Ark Syndicate Management, for purposes including policy administration.

JD Edwards IT Support
Northdoor, in partnership with Quistor, provides management of customers' JD Edwards applications.

Data management
Services are provided to assist clients in the areas of data management, data security, and data analysis using related products including those provided by IBM, and Kalido.

Data Security Platform 
In 2019, Northdoor announced its partnership with cyber security solution provider GeoLang, which enables Northdoor to deliver GeoLang's data security platform. 

Also in 2019, Northdoor partnered with the provider of enterprise data protection SaaS Cobalt Iron. Northdoor will be distributing the company's solutions to markets in the U.K. and Ireland. The two companies have also worked together to deliver a presentation on Machine Learning and Data Protection at the 2019 IBM Think Summit in London.

References

Consulting firms established in 1987
Technology companies based in London
Technology companies established in 1987